The City of Adelaide, also known as the Corporation of the City of Adelaide and Adelaide City Council is a local government area in the metropolitan area of greater Adelaide, South Australia and is legally defined as the capital city of South Australia by the City of Adelaide Act 1998. It includes the Adelaide city centre, North Adelaide, and the Adelaide Park Lands, which surround North Adelaide and the city centre.

Established in 1840, the City of Adelaide Municipal Corporation was the first municipal authority in Australia. At its time of establishment, Adelaide's (and Australia's) first mayor, James Hurtle Fisher, was elected. From 1919 onwards, the municipality has had a Lord Mayor,  being Jane Lomax-Smith.

History

Initially the new Province of South Australia was managed by Colonisation Commissioners. Colonial government commenced on 28 December 1836. The first municipality was established in 1840 as The City of Adelaide Municipal Corporation, the first municipality in the country. However, due to a combination of constitutional difficulties arising from the mayor's resignation, hostility of the incoming Governor George Grey, and falling revenues due to the onset of the colony's first economic crisis, the corporation became moribund in 1843, after the Province had become a Crown colony established by the South Australia Act 1842. From 1843 to 1849, control and management reverted to the colonial government, and from 1849 to 1852 the municipality was managed by a Commission with five members. With the positive economic effects of the Victorian gold rush, a formal municipality was re-established in 1852, and "has operated continuously ever since".  However, The city's relationship with the state and federal government has been described as being 'a continually abrasive relationship'.

The Council started in 1840 with nineteen members, who chose four of their number to be Aldermen, and then one of these (James Hurtle Fisher) to be Mayor. In 1852 the municipality was divided into four wards. Three Councillors and one Alderman were chosen, who in turn selected the Mayor. In 1861 the Mayor was chosen by all the electors and the position of Alderman was temporarily abolished. In 1873 the municipality was divided into six Wards, each represented by two Councillors. In 1880 the office of Alderman was recreated; they were chosen by electors of all Wards. The office of Mayor was raised to the stature of Lord Mayor by Royal Letters Patent in 1919. The Lord Mayor received the right to be styled ‘The Right Honourable’ in 1927.

The Arms of the City of Adelaide were granted by the Heralds College in 1929. In 1982 the Council approved the design of the Armorial Flag.

In 2015, the Council became the first government of any kind in Australia to offer a financial incentive for installing battery systems.

Governance
The City of Adelaide is legally defined as the capital city of South Australia by the City of Adelaide Act 1998, which also provides for a Capital City Committee, setting out its structure, function and responsibilities. The Act defines the Constitution of the council, including the role, allowances and benefits of the Lord Mayor and members. It defines the role of the CEO and their role with regard to Council employees. It continues the name of the council as "The Corporation of the City of Adelaide", and says that the land known as "The Corporation Acre" within the City of Adelaide is vested in the Adelaide City Council. It says that the name "Adelaide City Council" means the Corporation of the City of Adelaide.

 the City of Adelaide Council consists of 12 elected members, including the Lord Mayor and 11 Area and Ward Councillors, elected for a 4-year term. Area Councillors are elected by the voters of the whole council area as one electorate, while Ward Councillors are only elected by the voters of their respective wards.

Around the time of the November 2018 Council elections, reports emerged of the formation of a "Team Adelaide" faction, later leading to friction between elected members. In June 2022, Greg Mackie resigned, citing lack of civility and "relentless domination of the Team Adelaide faction" as the main reasons.

Council

The council, is:

Population
At the end of the 20th century, the city had little more than thirty per cent of the population it had in 1915 (when the population reached more than 43,000), and about 5,000 less than the 1855 population of 18,259. In proposing reforms and his advocacy for town planning legislation, Charles Reade illustrated the Adelaide slums associated with the city's high population levels with lantern-slides accompanying his lecture "Garden cities v. Adelaide slums and suburbs" in the Adelaide Town Hall on 8 Oct 1914. 
Reade was attacked by the Adelaide City Council who fought against the Town Planning and Housing Bill reforms and the press pointed out the wickedness of families being forced to 'herd together more and more in overcrowded conditions of living' and the 'sheer nonsense on the part of the City Council to pretend' that there were no slums in the city:

In seeking a return to higher density population levels, Adelaide City Council launched its 'New Directions' with its three themes of Capacity, Vivacity and Audacity on 3 July 2001. The "Capacity" theme proposed doubling the city's population by 2010 and increasing the number of City visitors and workers.

According to the Annual Reports, the population has increased rapidly, due to the targets stated in the strategic plans developed at about that time.

Notes
The population figures have been extracted from Adelaide City Council Annual reports. The data is summarised on pages 149-150 of A Thematic History. Additional data not in that summary can be found in the reports on the council's "Annual Reports" page.
1840 The initial Annual Report noted a population of 8,480, with 1,615 buildings in the city.
1844 The second available figure (6,107) is also the minimum recorded in council reports.
1880s There are no figures available for the period between 1881 and 1912. South Australia suffered a severe depression in the 1880s when the State population, (and probably the city's population too), declined.
1915 The peak population was 43,133.
1921 The State population passes 500,000. The city population was 39,458.
1963 The State population passes 1,000,000. The city population was 23,000.
1993 There is only one figure available between 1976 and 1999 – 11,405 in 1993. It was in the late 1990s that the council developed and started implementing its plans to increase the city's population, and not until 2004 when it started regularly updating the population estimates based on figures supplied by the Bureau of Census and Statistics.
2001 In 2001, the council set targets for population numbers for 2006 and 2010. These targets were raised considerably in 2003. In 2009, targets were set for 2012.

The following table sets out the figures of various types of city population in the 21st century:

 * Visitors to the city from the Adelaide Metropolitan area, for all purposes
 ** Square kilometres (millions of square metres) of office space. i.e. 1.503 km2 = 1,503,000 sq. metres.

Adelaide Park Lands

The city's 2010–11 Annual Report noted that the total area of the City of Adelaide is 15.6 km2, of which 7.6 km2 is Park Lands. Other sources put the Park Lands area closer to 7.0 km2. The original area was 2,300 acres (9.3 km2), a number the Council still regularly quotes.

Services and amenities
The City of Adelaide's administrative offices are located in the Colonel William Light Centre building at 25 Pirie Street, adjacent to the Adelaide Town Hall in King William Street.

Apart from providing the usual services like rubbish collection and controlling local development, the City of Adelaide owns and operates a number of city services and amenities, including:
 A network of 10 car parking stations (Andrew, Central Market, Flinders, Frome, Gawler, Grote, Light Square, Pirie, Rundle, Topham and Wyatt) branded as UPark.
 Adelaide Central Market, a popular tourist attraction and working market selling cheap fruit and vegetables and other products.
 Adelaide Aquatic Centre, offering several indoor heated swimming pools, diving facilities, and a health club.
 A network of local library and community centres from which local residents can borrow books, music, videos and computer programs, and gain access to computers and the internet.
 The council also runs a free bicycle service on weekdays, in conjunction with Bikes SA.
 Free bus services, 98C and 98A,(operated as The Connector until 2014), which runs through the central business district and North Adelaide, with stops at every major tourist attraction and council library. A new connector bus, with more seating capacity, entered service in 2007, replacing one of the smaller buses that used to ply the route. The bus is named Tindo (after the Kaurna word for sun) and is hailed as the world's first solar powered bus. The 98C is a clockwise loop while the 98A is anti-clockwise and the service has now been modified to better suit everyone's needs. The 97 was a temporary free bus which used to run for a few months.

Sister cities
The City of Adelaide has been involved in the Sister Cities program since 1972 and has international partnership arrangements with:
		 	
 Christchurch, New Zealand since 1972 - Sister city	
 George Town, Penang, Malaysia since 1973 - Sister city
 Himeji, Hyogo, Japan since 1982 - Sister city
 Austin, Texas, USA since 1983 - Sister city	 	
 Dalian, Liaoning, China since 2001 - Friendship city	
 Chengdu, Sichuan, China since 2001 - Friendship city
 Qingdao, Shandong, China since 2013 - Sister city

Flag

The armorial flag of Adelaide was approved on 2 August 1982, replacing the unofficial coat of arms on white background, which had been flown outside the Town Hall on special occasions for about 50 years.

Key to the City
The Key to the city is presented by the Lord Mayor to an individual or group to acknowledge and recognise their outstanding contribution to the city of Adelaide.

Notable residents
 William Bragg – Nobel Laureate of Physics – X-ray crystallography as a method for 3-D structure determination of inorganic salts
 Robin Warren – Nobel Laureate of Medicine – Discovered role of Helicobacter pylori in gastric ulcers
 Paul McDermott – Host of Good News Week

See also
 List of mayors and lord mayors of Adelaide
 List of Adelaide parks and gardens
 List of Adelaide suburbs
 Local government areas of South Australia

References

McDougall & Vines (2006) The City of Adelaide - A Thematic History, www.adelaidecitycouncil.com. (PDF, 780Kb, 156 pages)
Peter Morton (1996) After Light: A History of the City of Adelaide and its Council, 1878–1928

Further reading

 PDF

External links

 

Adelaide
Local government areas in Adelaide
Local government areas of South Australia
1840 establishments in Australia